Robert 'Bobby' Crutchley (born 24 May 1970 on the Wirral Peninsula) is a performance coach developer at British Gymnastics and former male English field hockey coach & player.

Hockey career
Crutchley represented England and Great Britain, winning 80 international caps. He played for England at the 1994 Men's Hockey World Cup and at the 1998 Commonwealth Games in Kuala Lumpur, where he won a bronze medal in the men's hockey.

Coaching career
He was Assistant Coach for the England & Great Britain men's teams from 2005 to 2012 and Head Coach from 2013 to 2018. During this time he coached at 3 Olympic Games, 3 World Cups, 7 European Championships and 4 Commonwealth Games.

Gymnastics
He was appointed Performance Coach Developer at British Gymnastics in 2018.

References

Living people
1970 births
British male field hockey players
English field hockey coaches
Team Bath Buccaneers Hockey Club players
English male field hockey players
Commonwealth Games medallists in field hockey
Commonwealth Games bronze medallists for England
Field hockey players at the 1998 Commonwealth Games
TeamBath coaches
British Olympic coaches
Medallists at the 1998 Commonwealth Games